is a Japanese football player. He plays for Cerezo Osaka.

Career
Reiya Morishita joined Cerezo Osaka in 2016. On March 13, he debuted in J3 League (v Grulla Morioka).

Club statistics
Updated to 23 February 2017.

References

External links
Profile at Cerezo Osaka

1998 births
Living people
Association football people from Osaka Prefecture
Japanese footballers
J2 League players
J3 League players
Cerezo Osaka players
Cerezo Osaka U-23 players
Tochigi SC players
Matsumoto Yamaga FC players
FC Machida Zelvia players
People from Kawachinagano
Association football defenders